The National War Memorial in Downtown St. John's is the most elaborate of all the post World War I monuments in Newfoundland and Labrador. It was erected at King's Beach on Water Street where, in 1583, Sir Humphrey Gilbert claimed Newfoundland for England (following John Cabot's 1497 expedition). It was formally unveiled on Memorial Day, July 1, 1924 by Field Marshal Douglas Haig, 1st Earl Haig. 

The Great War Veterans' Association and the Newfoundland Patriotic Association launched the campaign to have the National War Memorial established. They developed a committee to establish the design and undertake the fund-raising to pay for the proposed memorial. Construction of the memorial was supervised by Lieutenant-Colonel Father Thomas Nangle, the Roman Catholic Padre of Royal Newfoundland Regiment and (Ret) Captain Gerald (Gerry) Whitty.

Design

The design was semi-circular with a graduated plateau rising from the entrance stairway on Water Street to the cenotaph on Duckworth Street. The five figures were designed by two English sculptors, Ferdinand Victor Blundstone (top and sides) and Gilbert Bayes (front), and were cast in bronze by E.J. Parlanti of London, England. These figures represent Newfoundland's involvement in World War I.

At the top of the central pedestal is a figure of a woman. It symbolizes Newfoundland's willingness to serve and the spirit of loyalty to the Empire. She is holding a flaming torch in her left hand as a symbol of freedom. In her right hand, she is holding a sword poised and ready to battle, if she must. From the sides of the central pedestal, two wings of granite protrude. On the west wing, representing the Newfoundlanders who joined the Newfoundland Royal Naval Reserve, is a sailor holding a spyglass. On the east wing, representing the men of the Royal Newfoundland Regiment, is a soldier in full battle gear, loading his rifle, searching the horizon for "the enemy". 
 
Out in front, on the lower pedestal, are fishermen in oilskins and Wellington boots, and a lumberman with his axe slung over his shoulder, symbolizing the Newfoundlanders who served with the Merchant Marine and the Forestry Corps. Over their heads is a granite cross symbolizing the sacred nature of the war memorial. Below, is a bronze plaque stating that the memorial was erected by "a grateful people to honour its war dead". Similar plaques were added on both sides of the pedestal to commemorate the Newfoundlanders who died in World War II, the Korean War, and the War in Afghanistan.

Ceremonies
Each year the memorial is the site of several ceremonies to commemorate those service personnel who died in past wars. 
April 25, the date of the commemoration of the Gallipoli offensive in World War I
First Sunday in May, the Battle of the Atlantic is commemorated
July 1—Memorial Day—is the date of remembrance of Battle of the Somme at Beaumont-Hamel
Third Sunday in September, the anniversary of the Battle of Britain is celebrated 
November 11, is Armistice Day, the anniversary of the official end of World War I

Legacy
In 1928 Newfoundland issued a postage stamp titled 'War Memorial, St. John's', depicting the memorial.

References
 

Canadian military memorials and cemeteries
Buildings and structures in St. John's, Newfoundland and Labrador
1924 sculptures
Newfoundland in World War I
World War I memorials in Canada
Monuments and memorials in Newfoundland and Labrador